Horst Ademeit (8 February 1912 – 7 August 1944) was a German Luftwaffe fighter ace and recipient of the Knight's Cross of the Iron Cross with Oak Leaves during World War II. The Knight's Cross of the Iron Cross and its higher grade Oak Leaves was awarded to recognise extreme battlefield bravery or successful military leadership. A flying ace or fighter ace is a military aviator credited with shooting down five or more enemy aircraft during aerial combat.

Early life
Ademeit, the son of a Regierungsbaurat (government building officer), was born on 8 February 1912 in Breslau in the Kingdom of Prussia of the German Empire, present-day Wrocław in western Poland. He studied at the Königsberg Albertina University, a member of the Corps Masovia Königsberg. He then studied chemistry at the Technical University of Berlin and the Technical University of Braunschweig graduating as Diplom Ingenieur. He joined the military service of the Luftwaffe on 1 August 1936.

On 9 December 1938, Ademeit was made an officer cadet of the reserves and received flight training.

World War II
In the spring of 1940, Unteroffizier Ademeit was transferred to 3. Staffel of Jagdgeschwader 54 (JG 54—54th Fighter Wing) and participated in the Battle of Britain. He claimed his first victory on 18 September 1940. Shortly afterwards he was shot down over the Channel. He bailed out and was rescued by the Seenotdienst unharmed.

In June 1941, after the attack on the Soviet Union, he accompanied I./JG 54 to the Eastern Front. In quick succession he achieved aerial victories, promotions and awards. On 7 March 1943, Ademeit was appointed Staffelkapitän (squadron leader) of 6. Staffel of JG 54, replacing Oberleutnant Hans Beißwenger who was killed in action the day before.

In October 1943, Ademeit was credited with his 100th aerial victory. He was the 61st Luftwaffe pilot to achieve the century mark. On 4 February 1944, Ademeit succeeded Hauptmann Walter Nowotny as Gruppenkommandeur (group commander of I. Gruppe of JG 54. In the beginning of August 1944, Ademeit was appointed acting Geschwaderkommodore (wing commander) of JG 54.

On 7 August 1944, Ademeit, flying a Focke-Wulf Fw 190 A-5 (Werksnummer 5960 — factory number) pursued a Russian Il-2 Sturmovik ground-attack aircraft eastwards over Russian lines near Dünaburg, however he failed to return from this mission and is considered missing in action since. Berlin radio announced his loss on 29 September 1944.

Horst Ademeit was credited with 166 victories in over 600 missions over the Eastern Front. He was posthumously promoted to Major.

Summary of career

Aerial victory claims
According to US historian David T. Zabecki, Ademeit was credited with 166 aerial victories. Mathews and Foreman, authors of Luftwaffe Aces — Biographies and Victory Claims, researched the German Federal Archives and found documentation for 160 aerial victory claims, all of which confirmed and claimed on the Eastern Front. The authors Prien, Stemmer, Rodeike and Bock list six further victories, aerial victories numbered 99–104, which were not documented by Mathews and Foreman, in the timeframe 18 September to 3 October 1943.

Victory claims were logged to a map-reference (PQ = Planquadrat), for example "PQ 2525". These sectors were then subdivided into 36 smaller units to give a location area 3 × 4 km in size.

Awards
 Iron Cross (1939)
2nd Class (7 September 1940)
1st Class (5 September 1941)
 Front Flying Clasp of the Luftwaffe for fighter pilots in Gold and Penant
 Honour Goblet of the Luftwaffe on 8 December 1941 as Leutnant and pilot
 German Cross in Gold on 25 February 1942 as Leutnant in the 1./Jagdgeschwader 54
 Knight's Cross of the Iron Cross with Oak Leaves
 Knight's Cross on 16 April 1943 as Leutnant (war officer) and pilot in the I./Jagdgeschwader 54
 414th Oak Leaves on 2 March 1944 as Hauptmann (war officer) and Gruppenkommandeur of the I./Jagdgeschwader 54

See also
List of people who disappeared

Notes

References

Citations

Bibliography

 
 
 
 
 
 
 
 
 
 
 
 
 
 
 
 

1912 births
1940s missing person cases
1944 deaths
Aerial disappearances of military personnel in action
German World War II flying aces
Luftwaffe personnel killed in World War II
Luftwaffe pilots
Military personnel from Wrocław
Missing in action of World War II
Missing person cases in Europe
People from the Province of Silesia
Recipients of the Gold German Cross
Recipients of the Knight's Cross of the Iron Cross with Oak Leaves
University of Königsberg alumni